C.M. Anglo Bengali College also known as C.M. Anglo Bengali Inter College and as Anglo Bengali Inter College is a boys' school in Bhelupur, Varanasi, India. It was established in 1898 by Chintamani Mukherjee.

History
C.M. Anglo Bengali College was established by Chintamani Mukherjee in the year 1898. The intermediate college is affiliated with U.P. Board and offers education under the 10+2 education system. School campus is situated in Bhelupur, a southern suburb of Varanasi.

Noted alumni

 Hemanta Kumar Mukhopadhyay: Singer, composer / music director and film producer
 Jotin Bhattacharya: Sarod Player 
 Ram Naresh Yadav: Ex. Chief Minister of Uttar Pradesh
 Subrata Roy: Indian businessman and the founder and chairman of Indian conglomerate Sahara India
Nivaan Sen: An Indian Actor and Producer Actor

See also
List of educational institutions in Varanasi

References

Boys' schools in India
Intermediate colleges in Uttar Pradesh
Schools in Varanasi
Educational institutions established in 1898
1898 establishments in India